Cannon Spike, originally released in Japan as , is a multi-directional shooter arcade game released in 2000 by Psikyo and later in the same year for the Dreamcast by Capcom. It uses Capcom-designed characters and runs on Sega's Naomi Hardware. Cannon Spike is similar to games like Smash TV and Capcom's Commando, although with primary focus on boss fighting. Cannon Spike is noted as the last game released for Dreamcast in Europe, published by Bigben Interactive and exclusively sold at retail in Game outlets.

The international title, Cannon Spike, is the name of a trademark attack performed by Cammy, a character from the Street Fighter series of video games and one of the protagonists of this title.

Characters
The game's playable characters, which come from a range of Capcom games, include:
Arthur from Ghosts 'n Goblins
Baby Bonnie Hood (or Bulleta in Japan) from Darkstalkers (hidden character)
Cammy from the Street Fighter II series
Charlie (or Nash in Japan) from the Street Fighter Alpha series
Mega Man (or Rockman in Japan) from the Mega Man series (hidden character)
Shiba Shintaro from Three Wonders

One other character, Simone, was made specifically for the game and has not been featured in any game since. Simone shares a few similarities with another Capcom character, Linn Kurosawa, from Alien vs. Predator. Vega appears as an enemy character, named Fallen Balrog or Revenger Balrog in all regions.

Gameplay
In its arcade incarnation, the game is played using a joystick and three buttons; Mark (used to lock onto a targeted enemy), Shoot, and Attack (a close-range strike, usually more powerful or with greater knock-back compared to ordinary shooting). In addition to these basic commands, each character also has a ranged special attack (unleashed by pressing Shoot and Attack simultaneously), a close-range special (Mark and Attack simultaneously), and a super special (all three buttons simultaneously). The use of the super special requires a Special Token, occasionally dropped by a defeated enemy and always dropped by a defeated ally in 2-player mode.

Reception

The Dreamcast version received "average" reviews according to the review aggregation website Metacritic. Electronic Gaming Monthly and Game Informer gave it average reviews, months before its U.S. release. Greg Orlando of NextGen said that the game was "not quite artillerific, but it is a mindlessly fun way to murder some time." In Japan, Famitsu gave it a score of 30 out of 40.

Also in Japan, Game Machine listed the arcade version in their 15 November 2000 issue as the second most-successful arcade game of the month.

Notes

References

External links
Cannon Spike at HardcoreGaming101

2000 video games
Arcade video games
Capcom games
Crossover video games
Dreamcast games
Multidirectional shooters
Psikyo games
Video games about terrorism
Video games developed in Japan
Video games featuring female protagonists